The 1976 EuroHockey Club Champions Cup, taking place in Amsterdam, was the third edition of Europe's premier field hockey club competition. It was won by Southgate Hockey Club from London - the first of three titles in a row.

Standings
  Southgate HC
  Uccle Sport
  Rüsslesheimer RK
  Slavia Prague
  CD Terrassa
  Amsterdamsche HBC
  SC 1880 Frankfurt (defending champions)
  Inverleith HC
  Lyon
  HC Benevenuta
  Warta Poznań
  Cardiff HC

References

See also
European Hockey Federation

EuroHockey Club Champions Cup
International field hockey competitions hosted by the Netherlands
EuroHockey Club Champions Cup
EuroHockey Club Champions Cup
EuroHockey Club Champions Cup